Pachalúm is a municipality in the Guatemalan department of El Quiché.

Pachalúm had been a village in the municipality of Joyabaj, but was recognized as separate municipality in 1986.

History 

The name «Pachalum» originated from the Pachecas' game which men practiced under the shadow of a "Chalum" tree during the early years of the 20th century.

During the Spanish colony 

José de Alvarado —relative of conquistador Pedro de Alvarado— was given from the Kingdom of Guatemala authorities more than one hundred fifty acres of land in the Santa María Xoyavaj region, dando origen a los establecimientos de colonizadores españoles en la región.  Pachalúm was mentioned for the first time in 1817, as place for sugar production settled by Spanish families that arrived there from San Martín Jilotepeque, Santa Cruz El Chol and from most of the modern Baja Verapaz Department.

After Independence from Spain 

After the revolution against field marshal Vicente Cerna y Cerna in 1871, the families of the revolutionary leaders that helped the Liberal revolt asked Joyabaj mayor that their settlement became a village, which was granted on 9 August 1872.

Administrative division 

The municipality has an area of 100 km; besides the municipal capital, there are eight villages, thirteen settlements and five farm fields.

Topography 

Pachalúm is located in Sierra de Chuacús, specifically at the bottom of Tuncaj Hill, where several sprinkles come down. It is also close to the Motagua river  basin, cuyos afluentes, los ríos Las Vegas y Tumbadero, humedecen el terreno de la localidad.

Municipal government and infrastructure 

The first elections ever held in Pachalúm resulted in victory of Vicente de la Roca in 1986, but his term was not that effective due to the lack of experience on managing a municipality; the next mayor was Rafael Elías who focused on the area development. Afterwards, teach Reynabel Estrada Roca was elected, serving for three terms.

Among those projects finished during Estrada Roca's term in office are: 
 paved road between Pachalúm and Guatemala City, via Concuán
 Grocery market building
 Municipal Hotel
 Sports complex
 Urban area pavement
 irrigation project, led by Hugo Lorenzo Duarte Estrada

Other important access roads to Pachalúm are:
 Pachalúm -Chimaltenango, via San Martín Jilotepeque, 70% paved
 Pachalum - Santa Cruz del Quiché, 92 km long, with 16 km unpaved
 Pachalum - Cubulco, 20 km long

Climate 

Pachalúm has a tropical savanna climate (Köppen: Aw).

See also 
 
 
 El Quiché Department

References

External links
Municipalidad de Pachalúm

Municipalities of the Quiché Department